Boda Glasbruk is a village situated in Emmaboda Municipality, Kalmar County, Sweden. It had 201 inhabitants in 2005.

One of the glassworks of Kosta Glasbruk are situated here. The village was renamed from Förlångskvarn when the glassworks opened in 1874.

References

External links 

Populated places in Kalmar County
Värend
Glassmaking companies of Sweden